Mount Olive is a ghost town in Howard County, Arkansas, United States.

References

Geography of Howard County, Arkansas
Ghost towns in Arkansas